The San Antonio Riders were a professional American football team that played in the WLAF in 1991 and 1992. In return, Riders ownership scrapped plans to fund $235,000 in renovations to the Stadium. In June 1991, SAISD officials announced plans for a rent increase on the Riders for the 1992 season. The relationship would last for only one season.

The team was owned by Larry Benson, the brother of Tom Benson (owner of the New Orleans Saints of the NFL). The general managers were Tom Landry (Pro Football Hall of Fame coach) and Tom Landry, Jr.  The head coach for both seasons was Mike Riley.

The team's record in 1991 was 4-6. San Antonio turned things around in 1992 with a mark of 7-3. The Riders were not able to compete in the highly competitive North American West Division during the 1992 season, and like the Frankfurt Galaxy of 1991, they did not make the playoffs despite a 7-3 record.

Former players include professional wrestler John "Bradshaw" Layfield, better known as JBL of World Wrestling Entertainment (WWE), Jason Garrett who went on to play for and later serve as head coach for the Dallas Cowboys, and head coach Mike Riley, who went on to coach the San Diego Chargers of the NFL.

After the 1992 season saw the suspension of the WLAF (and ultimately the abandonment of North American teams), Benson applied to the Canadian Football League to have the Riders join that league instead for the 1993 season. The CFL accepted, and admitted the Riders and the Sacramento Surge/Gold Miners to the CFL. The Riders were to change names to the San Antonio Texans (there was already a Rough Riders and a Roughriders, both of whom were known as the "Riders" for short), but the team folded abruptly prior to the 1993 season. The San Antonio Texans name would later be used for the aforementioned Gold Miners when they moved to San Antonio in 1995.

Season-by-season

1991 season

Personnel

Staff

Roster

Schedule

1992 season

Personnel

Staff

Roster

Results
Week 1: San Antonio 17, Montreal Machine 16
Week 2: Birmingham Fire 17, San Antonio 10
Week 3: San Antonio 9, New York/New Jersey Knights 3
Week 4: San Antonio 23, Sacramento Surge 20 (OT)
Week 5: San Antonio 17, Ohio Glory 0
Week 6: San Antonio 17, Birmingham Fire 14
Week 7: Orlando Thunder 39, San Antonio 21
Week 8: San Antonio 17, Barcelona Dragons 0
Week 9: San Antonio 43, Frankfurt Galaxy 14
Week 10: Sacramento Surge 27, San Antonio 21

References

 
American football teams established in 1991
Sports clubs disestablished in 1992
1991 establishments in Texas
1992 disestablishments in Texas
NFL Europe (WLAF) teams
Defunct American football teams in Texas
Sports teams in San Antonio
Defunct Canadian Football League teams
Defunct Canadian football teams in the United States